Adeline is a village in Maryland Township, Ogle County, Illinois, United States, along the Leaf River. The population was 85 at the 2010 census, down from 139 in 2000.

History

Adeline was laid out in 1845. The village's name honors the wife of Thomas J. Turner, a state legislator.

Geography

Adeline is located at  (42.142382, -89.490633).

Demographics

As of the census of 2000, there were 139 people, 50 households, and 39 families residing in the village. The racial makeup of the village was 97.12% White, 0.72% Native American, 2.16% from other races. Hispanic or Latino of any race were 2.88% of the population.

There were 50 households, out of which 40.0% had children under the age of 18 living with them, 64.0% were married couples living together, 12.0% had a female householder with no husband present, and 22.0% were non-families. 16.0% of all households were made up of individuals, and 4.0% had someone living alone who was 65 years of age or older. The average household size was 2.78 and the average family size was 3.18.

In the village, the population was spread out, with 28.1% under the age of 18, 5.8% from 18 to 24, 30.2% from 25 to 44, 28.1% from 45 to 64, and 7.9% who were 65 years of age or older. The median age was 38 years. For every 100 females, there were 93.1 males. For every 100 females age 18 and over, there were 100.0 males.

The median income for a household in the village was $59,583, and the median income for a family was $61,250. Males had a median income of $44,688 versus $36,250 for females. The per capita income for the village was $20,301. There were 4.5% of families and 2.8% of the population living below the poverty line, including no under eighteens and 33.3% of those over 64.

Notes

External links
 

Villages in Ogle County, Illinois
Villages in Illinois
1845 establishments in Illinois